Jacques Debary (25 November 1914 – 9 December 2011) was a French actor.

Filmography

References

External links

1914 births
2011 deaths
People from Saint-Quentin, Aisne
French male film actors
French male television actors
French male stage actors